Kelimutu (pronounced ) is a volcano, close to the small town of Moni in central Flores island in Indonesia. It has three volcanic crater lakes that differ in color.

The science of the Kelimutu lakes is relatively well-known, and the changes in color and temperature are concluded to be related to volcanic activity and the resulting fluid flux at vents at the bottom of the lakes. The Lake colors periodically change due to adjustments in the oxidation-reduction status of the fluid of each lake, and also considering the abundance of different major elements, such as iron and manganese. Oxidation-reduction status depends on the balance of volcanic gas input and rainfall rate, and is thought to be mediated by the groundwater system in the volcano itself. The colors in the lakes change independently from each other, as each has its own unique connectivity to the underlying volcano's activity. Between January and November 2016, the colors of the craters changed six times. Although it is widely believed that the changes are unpredictable, it is more accurate to say that the lack of any regular monitoring of the volcanic system precludes scientists from having the data necessary to drive widely available predictive models.

Geological details

The volcano contains three striking summit crater lakes of varying colors. Tiwu Ata Bupu (Lake of Old People) is usually blue and is the westernmost of the three lakes. The other two lakes, Tiwu Ko'o Fai Nuwa Muri (Lake of Young Men and Maidens) and Tiwu Ata Polo (Bewitched or Enchanted Lake) are separated by a shared crater wall and are typically green or red respectively. The lake colors vary on a periodic basis. Subaqueous fumaroles are the probable cause of active upwelling that occurs at the two eastern lakes.

The Tiwu Ko'o Fai Nuwa Muri has been a source of minor phreatic eruptions in historical time. The scenic lakes are a popular tourist destination.

Kelimutu is also of interest to geologists, because the three lakes have different colors, yet are at the crest of the same volcano. According to Kelimutu National Park officials, the colour changes as a result of chemical reactions resulting from the minerals contained in the lake perhaps triggered by volcano gas activity.  However, it is more accurate to refer to the color changes as being driven by oxidation-reduction chemical dynamics. Kawah Putih lake in West Java, south of Bandung, is another crater lake in Indonesia with some similarities to the lakes at Kelimutu.

Tourism

In the early days of developing the local national park in the Kelimutu area, there were some disputes with local communities over the use of the resources. More recently, forest rangers have worked to develop better relations with nearby village communities and overall management has improved.

The area is said to have begun to attract attention after being noticed by a regional Dutch military commander, B. van Suchtelen in 1915 and became more well known after Y. Bouman wrote about the site in 1929.

The closest airports are Maumere, and Ende. There are regular flights to Ende from Bali. The drive from Ende to Moni, the town at the base of Kelimutu where accommodation is available, takes about 3 hours, while from Moni to Kelimutu vehicle park, a  drive, needs 45 minutes. Usually tourists sleep one night to catch sunrise at Kelimutu.

Local Culture 
Kelimutu is sacred to the local Lio people, who believe the souls of the dead migrate here. Young people's souls go to the warmth of Tiwu Koo Fai Nuwa Muri (Lake of Young Men and Maidens), old people's to the cold of Tiwu Ata Bupu (Lake of Old People), and those of the wicked to Tiwu Ata Polo (Bewitched or Enchanted Lake). Pork, betel nuts, rice and other valuable offerings are left on ceremonial rocks beside the lakes, amid the dancing of the Lio's annual 'Feed the Spirit of the Forefathers' ceremony, on August 14.

See also

 Kelimutu National Park
 List of volcanoes in Indonesia

Gallery

References

External links

 
 Volume 28, No. 3, pp. 137-306 of the Geochemical Journal is a special issue of the journal dedicated to Volcanic lakes.

Mountains of Flores Island (Indonesia)
Volcanoes of the Lesser Sunda Islands
Complex volcanoes
Volcanic crater lakes
Active volcanoes of Indonesia
Landforms of Flores Island (Indonesia)
Landforms of East Nusa Tenggara